Jonas "Joe" Davis (12 May 1859 – 18 May 1911) was an Australian cricketer.

Davis played for the New South Wales XV against the Australians in 1878-79 and scored 32 in an innings victory for the New South Wales team, the Sydney Morning Herald recording that Davis "proved that the confidence placed in his powers as a batsman was justified". He subsequently played twenty first-class matches for New South Wales between 1879–80 and 1893–94.

A batsman and occasional wicket-keeper, Joe Davis' highest first-class score was for New South Wales against Ivo Bligh's XI in 1882–83, when, opening the batting, he scored 85 in the second innings out of a team total of 165. He dropped out of the New South Wales team for interstate matches after the 1887–88 season, but he returned to captain the team on tours of New Zealand, in 1889-90 and 1893-94, both tours having been organised and managed by Davis' older brother, Coleman.

Davis was a jeweller. He married Phoebe Davis in Sydney in February 1885.

He collapsed while playing bowls in May 1911 and died at home early the next morning, aged 52. He left a widow, a son and three daughters. He was buried in the Jewish section of Rookwood Cemetery, Sydney. He is sometimes called "Jonas J. Davis", but his probate notice refers to him as "JONAS DAVIS commonly known as Joseph Davis".

See also
 List of New South Wales representative cricketers

References

External links
 

1859 births
1911 deaths
Australian cricketers
Jewish Australian sportspeople
Jewish cricketers
New South Wales cricketers
People from Goulburn
Cricketers from New South Wales